Volodymyr monument may refer to:

 Monument to Prince Volodymyr, Kyiv
 Statue of Saint Volodymyr, London
 Monument to Vladimir the Great, Moscow